The Star of Deltora is a series of four novels by Emily Rodda, set in the same world as the series Deltora Quest, The Three Doors, and Rowan of Rin. At the center of the series are the adventures of Britta, a Deltoran trader, and three other traders. They travel aboard the titular ship and compete in a quest for the Trader Rosalyn Apprenticeship.

Shadows of the Master, released August 1, 2015, is the title of the first book in the series and sets the stage for the rivalry between Britta and three other traders aboard the titular ship Star of Deltora, in their quest for the Trader Rosalyn Apprenticeship. They travel together to the Two Moons swamplands (Two Moons) and Illica, the home of the mysterious Collectors (Towers of Illica). The last book, The Hungry Isle, follows their escape from Illica.

Australian fantasy novel series
Books by Jennifer Rowe
Deltora
Fantasy books by series
Series of children's books
Works published under a pseudonym